Deh-e Mowla (also Romanized as Deh-e Mowlā, Deh Maula, and Deh Mowlā; also known as Deh-e Mollā) is a village in Malmir Rural District, Sarband District, Shazand County, Markazi Province, Iran. At the 2006 census, its population was 105, in 32 families.

References 

Populated places in Shazand County